An enclave is a territory (or a small territory apart of a larger one) that is entirely surrounded by the territory of one other state or entity. Enclaves may also exist within territorial waters. Enclave is sometimes used improperly to denote a territory that is only partly surrounded by another state. The Vatican City and San Marino, both enclaved by Italy, and Lesotho, enclaved by South Africa, are completely enclaved sovereign states.

An exclave is a portion of a state or district geographically separated from the main part by surrounding alien territory (of one or more states or districts etc). Many exclaves are also enclaves, but not all: an exclave can be surrounded by the territory of more than one state. The Azerbaijani exclave of Nakhchivan is an example of an exclave that is not an enclave, as it borders Armenia, Turkey and Iran.

Semi-enclaves and semi-exclaves are areas that, except for possessing an unsurrounded sea border (a coastline contiguous with international waters), would otherwise be enclaves or exclaves. Enclaves and semi-enclaves can exist as independent states (Monaco, The Gambia and Brunei are semi-enclaves), while exclaves and semi-exclaves proper always constitute just a part of a sovereign state (like the Kaliningrad Oblast).

A pene-exclave is a part of the territory of one country that can be conveniently approached—in particular, by wheeled traffic—only through the territory of another country. Pene-exclaves are also called functional exclaves or practical exclaves. Many pene-exclaves partially border their own territorial waters (i.e., they are not surrounded by other nations' territorial waters), such as Point Roberts, Washington and Minnesota's Northwest Angle. A pene-exclave can also exist entirely on land, such as when intervening mountains render a territory inaccessible from other parts of a country except through alien territory. A commonly cited example is the Kleinwalsertal, a valley part of Vorarlberg, Austria, that is accessible only from Germany to the north.

Origin and usage
The word enclave is French and first appeared in the mid-15th century as a derivative of the verb  (1283), from the colloquial Latin  (to close with a key). Originally, it was a term of property law that denoted the situation of a land or parcel of land surrounded by land owned by a different owner, and that could not be reached for its exploitation in a practical and sufficient manner without crossing the surrounding land. In law, this created a servitude of passage for the benefit of the owner of the surrounded land. The first diplomatic document to contain the word enclave was the Treaty of Madrid, signed in 1526.

Later, the term enclave began to be used also to refer to parcels of countries, counties, fiefs, communes, towns, parishes, etc. that were surrounded by alien territory. This French word eventually entered English and other languages to denote the same concept, although local terms have continued to be used. In India, the word "pocket" is often used as a synonym for enclave (such as "the pockets of Puducherry district"). In British administrative history, subnational enclaves were usually called detachments or detached parts, and national enclaves as detached districts or detached dominions. In English ecclesiastic history, subnational enclaves were known as peculiars (see also royal peculiar).

The word exclave is a logically extended back-formation of enclave.

Characteristics

Enclaves exist for a variety of historical, political and geographical reasons. For example, in the feudal system in Europe, the ownership of feudal domains was often transferred or partitioned, either through purchase and sale or through inheritance, and often such domains were or came to be surrounded by other domains. In particular, this state of affairs persisted into the 19th century in the Holy Roman Empire, and these domains (principalities, etc.) exhibited many of the characteristics of sovereign states. Prior to 1866 Prussia alone consisted of more than 270 discontiguous pieces of territory.

Residing in an enclave within another country has often involved difficulties in such areas as passage rights, importing goods, currency, provision of utilities and health services, and host nation cooperation. Thus, over time, enclaves have tended to be eliminated. For example, two-thirds of the then-existing national-level enclaves were extinguished on 1 August 2015, when the governments of India and Bangladesh implemented a Land Boundary Agreement that exchanged 162 first-order enclaves (111 Indian and 51 Bangladeshi). This exchange thus effectively de-enclaved another two dozen second-order enclaves and one third-order enclave, eliminating 197 of the India–Bangladesh enclaves in all. The residents in these enclaves had complained of being effectively stateless. Only Bangladesh's Dahagram–Angarpota enclave remained.

Netherlands and Belgium decided to keep the enclave and exclave system in Baarle. As both Netherlands and Belgium are members of the European Union and Schengen Area, people, goods and services flow freely with little or no restrictions.

Enclave versus exclave
For illustration, in the figure (above), A1 is a semi-enclave (attached to C and also bounded by water that only touches C's territorial water). Although A2 is an exclave of A, it cannot be classed as an enclave because it shares borders with B and C. The territory A3 is both an exclave of A and an enclave from the viewpoint of B. The singular territory D, although an enclave, is not an exclave.

True enclaves

An enclave is a part of the territory of a state that is enclosed within the territory of another state. To distinguish the parts of a state entirely enclosed in a single other state, they are called true enclaves. A true enclave cannot be reached without passing through the territory of a single other state that surrounds it. In 2007, Evgeny Vinokurov called this the restrictive definition of "enclave" given by international law, which thus "comprises only so-called 'true enclaves'". Two examples are Büsingen am Hochrhein, a true enclave of Germany, and Campione d'Italia, a true enclave of Italy, both of which are surrounded by Switzerland.

The definition of a territory comprises both land territory and territorial waters. In the case of enclaves in territorial waters, they are called maritime (those surrounded by territorial sea) or lacustrine (if in a lake) enclaves. Most of the true national-level enclaves now existing are in Asia and Europe. While subnational enclaves are numerous the world over, there are only a few national-level true enclaves in Africa, Australia and the Americas (each such enclave being surrounded by the territorial waters of another country).

A historical example is West Berlin before the reunification of Germany. Since 1945, all of Berlin was ruled de jure by the four Allied powers. However, the East German government and the Soviet Union treated East Berlin as an integral part of East Germany, so West Berlin was a de facto enclave within East Germany. Also, 12 small West Berlin enclaves, such as Steinstücken, were separated from the city, some by only a few meters.

Enclaved countries

Three nations qualify as completely surrounded by another country's land and/or internal waters:  
 The Republic of San Marino, enclaved within Italy
 Vatican City, enclaved within the city of Rome, Italy
 The Kingdom of Lesotho, enclaved within South Africa

The Republic of Artsakh, a disputed territory not recognised by any UN member states, controls part of Nagorno-Karabakh, which is an enclave within Azerbaijan.

Historically, four Bantustans (or "Black homelands") of South Africa were granted nominal independence, unrecognized internationally, by the Apartheid government from 1976 until their reabsorption in 1994. Others remained under government rule from 1948 to 1994. Being heavily partitioned, various parts of these Bantustans were true enclaves.

The United States' constitutional principle of tribal sovereignty treats federally recognized Indian reservations as quasi-independent enclaves.

True exclaves

True exclave is an extension of the concept of true enclave. In order to access a true exclave from the mainland, a traveller must go through the territory of at least one other state. Examples include:
 Nakhchivan, which borders Turkey, Armenia and Iran, is an exclave of Azerbaijan.
 Baarle-Hertog is a collection of Belgian exclaves in the Netherlands.
 In the United Arab Emirates, four emirates have five true exclaves: Dubai (Hatta), Ajmān (Masfout and Manama), Ras al-Khaimah (the southerly of the emirate's two non-contiguous sections), and Sharjah (Nahwa, also both a true national-level enclave and a counter-enclave).
 Llívia is an enclave and exclave of Spain surrounded by France.
 Campione d'Italia is an enclave and exclave of Italy surrounded by Switzerland.
 Büsingen am Hochrhein is an enclave and exclave of Germany surrounded by Switzerland. The shortest distance from Büsingen's borders to the main portion of German territory is only about 700 metres (about 2,300 ft).
 Likoma and Chizumulu Islands in Lake Malawi are lacustrine enclaves and exclaves of Malawi, surrounded by Mozambique territorial waters.

Related constructs and terms

Semi-enclaves and semi-exclaves

Semi-enclaves and semi-exclaves are areas that, except for possessing an unsurrounded sea border, would otherwise be enclaves or exclaves. Semi-enclaves can exist as independent states that border only one other state, such as Monaco, the Gambia and Brunei. Vinokurov (2007) declares, "Technically, Portugal, Denmark, and Canada also border only one foreign state, but they are not enclosed in the geographical, political, or economic sense. They have vast access to international waters. At the same time, there are states that, although in possession of sea access, are still enclosed by the territories of a foreign state." Therefore, a quantitative principle applies: the land boundary must be longer than the coastline. Thus a state is classified as a sovereign semi-enclave if it borders on just one state, and its land boundary is longer than its sea coastline.

(Since Vinokurov's writing in 2007, Canada and Denmark have each gained a second bordering state—each other—with the 2022 division of Hans Island.)

Vinokurov affirms that "no similar quantitative criterion is needed to define the scope of non-sovereign semi-enclaves/exclaves." Examples include:

 Alaska, one of the states in the United States of America, is the largest semi-enclave in the world, separated from the US by Canada.  
 Oecusse, a district on the northwestern side of the island of Timor, is a semi-enclave of East Timor separated from the rest of the country by Indonesia.
 Ceuta and Melilla are Spanish semi-enclaves on the Mediterranean coast of Morocco.
 Temburong District is a Bruneian semi-enclave surrounded by Malaysia. The Temburong Bridge connects Temburong to the Brunei mainland.
 Kokkina, a village in the de facto state of Northern Cyprus, is a semi-enclave situated on the Mediterranean coast. It is separated from the rest of the country by the Republic of Cyprus.
 Kaliningrad Oblast is a federal subject of Russia (an oblast), a semi-exclave situated on the Baltic coast and bordering Lithuania and Poland. Sea access from the Russian mainland is possible from Saint Petersburg via the Gulf of Finland without passing through other states' territory.
 Cabinda (also spelled Kabinda, formerly Portuguese Congo) is a semi-exclave and a province of Angola on the Atlantic coast of southwestern Africa, separated by the only sea-access port of the Democratic Republic of the Congo; also bordered by the Republic of the Congo.
 French Guiana (a French Overseas Department), in South America, is a semi-exclave that is bounded by Suriname, Brazil, and the Atlantic Ocean.
 The southern part of Dubrovnik-Neretva County in Croatia is separated from the rest of the country by Neum in Bosnia and Herzegovina and is also bordered by Montenegro. The Republic of Ragusa once gave the town of Neum to the Ottoman Empire because it did not want to have a land border with Venice; this small municipality was inherited by Bosnia and Herzegovina. The Pelješac Bridge links the semi-exclave to the rest of country.

Subnational enclaves and exclaves

Sometimes, administrative divisions of a country, for historical or practical reasons, caused some areas to belong to one division while being attached to another. Examples include:

 In India:
 Dadra, enclaved within the state of Gujarat, is part of Dadra and Nagar Haveli and Daman and Diu in India.
 Puducherry district, of the Union Territory of Puducherry, is made of 12 non-contiguous parts, many of them are true enclaves entirely surrounded by the state of Tamil Nadu. Before Puducherry, along with the other territories of French India, was absorbed into India in 1954, they were enclaved within the Union of India, and before that the British Raj. Mahe district of Puducherry is made of three non-contiguous parts, two of which are true enclaves within the state of Kerala. Yanam district of Puducherry is an enclave surrounded entirely by the state of Andhra Pradesh.
 From 1947 to 1971, Bangladesh was a part of Pakistan as its East Pakistan exclave, separated from West Pakistan by 1,760 kilometers (1,100 miles) of India. It eventually gained independence in 1971, during the Bangladesh Liberation War.
 In the United Kingdom:
 Before 1974, and especially before 1844, there were many exclaves of counties in England and Wales.
 The counties of Scotland before reorganisation in 1889 included dozens of exclaves. This was especially notable in the case of Cromartyshire, which was split into at least nine parts spread across Ross-shire.
 In France:
 The French department of Pyrénées-Atlantiques, in the southwest of France, surrounds two enclaves of the neighbouring department of Hautes-Pyrénées.
 The French department of Vaucluse has a rather large exclave to its north that is an enclave within the Drôme department – the canton of Valréas (historically known as Enclave des Papes).
 San Colombano al Lambro is an exclave of the province of Milan at the junction between the Pavia and Lodi provinces. The exclave arose when the province of Lodi was carved out of the province of Milan, but a referendum in San Colombano indicated the locals' wish to stay in Milan. As a result, the commune is the only wine-producing area in the mostly urbanized province of Milan.

 In the United States:
A portion of Ellis Island is an exclave of New York City within the boundaries of Jersey City, and therefore of New York State within the boundaries of New Jersey.
 The Kentucky Bend exists because of a meander of the Mississippi River.
 West Hollywood and Beverly Hills, California, adjoin one another, but are entirely surrounded by the city of Los Angeles. San Fernando, California, is entirely surrounded by the city of Los Angeles.
 Jeddito, Arizona, lies within a  exclave of the Navajo Nation. This exclave is surrounded by territory of the Hopi Reservation, which is itself surrounded by the Navajo Nation.

"Practical" enclaves, exclaves and inaccessible districts

The term pene-exclave was defined in Robinson (1959) as "parts of the territory of one country that can be approached conveniently – in particular by wheeled traffic – only through the territory of another country." Thus, a pene-exclave, although having land borders, is not completely surrounded by the other's land or territorial waters. Catudal (1974) and Vinokurov (2007) further elaborate upon examples, including Point Roberts. "Although physical connections by water with Point Roberts are entirely within the sovereignty of the United States, land access is only possible through Canada."

Pene-enclaves are also called functional enclaves or practical enclaves. They can exhibit continuity of state territory across territorial waters but, nevertheless, a discontinuity on land, such as in the case of Point Roberts. Along rivers that change course, pene-enclaves can be observed as complexes comprising many small pene-enclaves. A pene-enclave can also exist entirely on land, such as when intervening mountains render a territory, although geographically attached, inaccessible from other parts of a country except through alien territory. A commonly cited example is the Kleinwalsertal, a valley part of Vorarlberg, Austria, that is only accessible from Germany to the north, being separated from the rest of Austria by high mountains traversed by no roads. Another example is the Spanish village of Os de Civís, accessible from Andorra.

Hence, such areas are enclaves or exclaves for practical purposes, without meeting the strict definition. Many pene-exclaves partially border the sea or another body of water, which comprises their own territorial waters (i.e., they are not surrounded by other nations' territorial waters). They border their own territorial waters in addition to a land border with another country, and hence they are not true exclaves. Still, one cannot travel to them on land without going through another country. Attribution of a pene-enclave status to a territory can sometimes be disputed, depending on whether the territory is considered to be practically inaccessible from the mainland or not.

 Northern Ireland, an area of the United Kingdom, is bounded by the Republic of Ireland, the Irish Sea and the Atlantic Ocean.
 Equatorial Guinea's continental portion, Río Muni, is a semi-exclave surrounded by Gabon, Cameroon and the Atlantic Ocean.
 The Northwest Angle in the U.S. state of Minnesota is geographically separated from the rest of the state (and United States) by the Lake of the Woods and is accessible on land only through the Canadian province of Manitoba. Additionally, Elm Point, south of the town of Buffalo Point in Manitoba, is separated from the rest of Minnesota by Lake of the Woods.
 Point Roberts, Washington, United States, is an unincorporated community in Whatcom County—located on the southernmost tip of the Tsawwassen Peninsula, south of Delta, British Columbia, Canada—that can be reached by land from the rest of the United States only by traveling through Canada.
 The U.S. state of Vermont has two pene-enclaves with the Canadian province of Quebec. The promontory is cut through by the U.S./Canadian border; as such the area is a practical enclave of the United States contiguous with Canada. Similarly, the southern point of Province Island, a small island mostly in Quebec, crosses into Vermont. It is situated in Lake Memphremagog, near Newport, Vermont.
 Walvis Bay, now part of Namibia, was a pene-exclave of the Cape Colony in German South-West Africa, created in 1878. It became part of the Cape Province of the Union of South Africa in 1910, but from 1922, it was administered as a de facto part of South-West Africa, a League of Nations Mandate. In 1977, it was separated from that territory and re-integrated into the Cape Province. South Africa did not relinquish sovereignty over Walvis Bay until 1994, nearly four years after Namibia's independence.
 Baritú National Park in Argentina can only be accessed by road through Bolivia, as it is separated from the nearest Argentinian roads by vast stretches of uninhabited rainforest.

Subnational "practical" enclaves, exclaves, and inaccessible districts
 Although the Jervis Bay Territory, which occupies a coastal peninsula in Australia, is not part of the Australian Capital Territory, the laws of the ACT apply to it. This was to give the ACT coastal access, which it did not have as it was entirely surrounded by the state of New South Wales.
 The Romanian village of Nămoloasa (Galați County) can be accessed only through Vrancea County (where there is a bridge over the Siret), because it is separated by the Siret from the rest of Galați County.
 The southern part of the Province of Venice, Veneto, can be reached directly from the rest of the province only by boat. By land it can be reached only by traveling through the Province of Padua because territorial continuity with the main part of the province exists only through some unconnected islands and islets.
 It is not possible to drive from the northern half of County Leitrim in the Republic of Ireland to the southern half without leaving the county; Lough Allen and the River Shannon present a water barrier requiring one to drive through County Cavan to the east or County Roscommon to the west.
 The community of East Kemptville, Nova Scotia, Canada, is part of the Municipality of Argyle, but it can only be reached by road from the rest of the municipality by travelling through the Municipality of Yarmouth or the Municipality of Shelburne. The latter route also requires travelling through the Municipality of Barrington.
 The southeastern part of the Tai Po District (northern part of the Sai Kung Peninsula), Hong Kong, can be reached directly from the rest of the district only by boat. By land it can be reached only by traveling through the Sha Tin District because territorial continuity with the main part of the district is cut off by the Tolo Harbour. In the past, when there was no road network serving the region, the residents commonly travelled by boat to Tai Po Market for their daily lives, hence the districts were drawn this way, but now most of the ferries no longer exist, and residents travel by road to markets in Sha Tin District (Ma On Shan or Sha Tin) instead.
 Within the United States:
 Several portions of land, including parts of Finns Point and Artificial Island, on the New Jersey side of the Delaware River are Delaware territory. Within the Twelve-Mile Circle, Delaware's border extends to the low-water mark across the river. Outside of the Circle, the Delaware – New Jersey border follows the middle of the river and Delaware Bay.
 The Eastern Shore of Virginia on the southern portion of the Delmarva Peninsula shares a border with Maryland but is only connected to the rest of Virginia by the Chesapeake Bay Bridge-Tunnel, which is part of U.S. Route 13. 
 The city of Carter Lake, Iowa is separated from the rest of the state of Iowa by the Missouri River, which changed course during a flood in 1877, cutting the city off from the rest of the state. It is now only accessible through Omaha, Nebraska.
 The village of Kaskaskia, Illinois, the state's first capital, is separated from the rest of Illinois by the Mississippi River due to a flood in 1881, which shifted the river to flow east of the town, rather than west. This resulted in the only access to the town being from Missouri.
 The Upper Peninsula of Michigan is separated from the Lower Peninsula by the Straits of Mackinac, so until the Mackinac Bridge was completed in 1957, the only land routes between them were through the states of Wisconsin, Illinois, and Indiana, or through the Canadian province of Ontario.
 The Marble Hill neighborhood of Manhattan was separated from the rest of the borough by the construction of the Harlem Ship Canal in 1895 and then connected to the North American mainland and the Bronx when the Harlem River was filled in on its north side in 1914.
 Although O'Hare International Airport is located in Chicago, it can only be reached directly from the rest of the city by passing through the suburban edge city of Rosemont.

Enclaves within enclaves

It is possible for an enclave of one country to be completely surrounded by a part of another country that is itself an enclave of the first country. These enclaves are sometimes called counter-enclaves. Two such complexes containing them exist currently:

The Dutch municipality of Baarle-Nassau has seven exclaves in two exclaves of the Belgian municipality of Baarle-Hertog.
 Nahwa of the United Arab Emirates is surrounded by Madha, an exclave of Oman within the U.A.E.

The former complex of enclaves at Cooch Behar district included 24 second-order enclaves and one small third-order enclave called Dahala Khagrabari #51: a piece of India within a part of Bangladesh, within a part of India, within Bangladesh. The Indo-Bangladesh enclaves were exchanged on 31 July 2015 by the ratified Land Boundary Agreement, and Dahala Khagrabari was ceded to Bangladesh.

The border arrangements concerning the Vennbahn meant that, from 1922 to 1949, a Belgian counter-enclave existed within a German enclave.

Ethnic enclaves
An ethnic enclave is a community of an ethnic group inside an area in which another ethnic group predominates. Ghettos, Little Italys, barrios and Chinatowns are examples. These areas may have a separate language, culture and economic system.
 Székely Land is a Hungarian ethnic enclave within Romania, with its people calling themselves Székely. Originally, the name Székely Land denoted an autonomous region within Transylvania. It existed as a legal entity from medieval times until the Austro-Hungarian Compromise of 1867, when the Székely and Saxon seats were dissolved and replaced by the county system. Along with Transylvania, it became a part of Romania in 1920, according with the Treaty of Trianon signed on 4 June 1920 at the Grand Trianon Palace in Versailles, France. In 1938–1940, during World War II, post-Trianon Hungary temporarily expanded its territory and included some additional territories that were formerly part of the pre-war Kingdom of Hungary, under Third Reich auspices, the Second Vienna Award. It was later reduced to boundaries approximating those of 1920 by the peace treaties signed after World War II at Paris, in 1947. The area was called Magyar Autonomous Region between September 8, 1952, and February 16, 1968, a Hungarian autonomous region within Romania, and today there are territorial autonomy initiatives to reach a higher level of self-governance for this region within Romania.
 There are several Serb enclaves in Kosovo where the institutions of Kosovo are not fully operational due to disputes.

Extraterritoriality
Diplomatic missions, such as embassies and consulates, as well as military bases, are usually exempted from the jurisdiction of the host country, i.e., the laws of the host nation in which an embassy is located do not typically apply to the land of the embassy or base itself. This exemption from the jurisdiction of the host country is defined as extraterritoriality. Areas and buildings enjoying some forms of extraterritoriality are not true enclaves since, in all cases, the host country retains full sovereignty. In addition to embassies, some other areas enjoy a limited form of extraterritoriality.

Examples of this include:
 Pavillon de Breteuil in France, used by the General Conference on Weights and Measures.
 United Nations headquarters in the United States, used by the United Nations.
 United Nations Office at Geneva in Switzerland, used by the United Nations.
 INTERPOL headquarters in Lyon, France, used by INTERPOL.
 NATO (political) headquarters near Evere in Haren, a part of the City of Brussels, Belgium.
 Headquarters of Allied Command Operations (NATO) at the area designated as Supreme Headquarters Allied Powers Europe (SHAPE), north of Mons, Belgium.
 Palazzo Malta and the Villa del Priorato di Malta, the headquarters of Sovereign Military Order of Malta in Rome. In addition to extraterritoriality, Italy recognizes the exercise by SMOM of all the prerogatives of sovereignty in its headquarters. Therefore, Italian sovereignty and SMOM sovereignty uniquely coexist without overlapping.
 Extraterritorial properties of the Holy See in Rome and surroundings.
 By treaty of 2 November 1929, Czechoslovakia obtained the lease for 99 years of two plots of land (in the Moldauhafen and in the Saalehafen), both within the perimeter of the free port of Hamburg. Another plot, in the Peutehafen, was purchased by the Czechoslovak government in 1929; this plot lies just outside the free-port perimeter.
 Saalehafen – approximately 2 ha of land on Hallesches Ufer, on the southeastern bank of the Saalehafen.
 Moldauhafen – approximately 0.5 ha of land on Dresdener Ufer, on the southeastern bank of the Moldauhafen.
 Peutehafen – the narrow peninsula between the Peutekanal and the Peutehafen dock, comprising 8.054 ha of land and 0.5 ha of water surface.
 In Szczecin, Poland, a similar provision existed following the Treaty of Versailles for Czechoslovakia to have access to the harbor, which until the end of World War II was located in Germany. From 1945, when Szczecin became part of Poland, Czechoslovakia possessed no extraterritorial rights there. It appears that the German concession ceased at the end of the war and that no successor paid attention to the pre-war rights that Czechoslovakia had under the Versailles Treaty. Neither the Polish nor the occupying Russians appear to have assumed any of Germany's pre-war liabilities. Czechoslovakia gave up the rights to its territory in Szczecin under an agreement signed on 13 January 1956.
 Saimaa Canal: the longitudinal half of the canal in Russia is leased by Finland until 2063. Russian law is in principle valid, but in reality, Finland maintains the area.
 Under a treaty between the United Kingdom and the Kingdom of the Netherlands, a Scottish Court was established at Camp Zeist near Utrecht for the trial of those accused in the Lockerbie bombing. The premises were under the authority of the court and immune from external interference for the duration of the trial and subsequent appeal, which lasted from 1999 to 2002. Dutch law continued to apply there in principle but the court was allowed to enact superseding regulations, and court officials enjoyed diplomatic immunity. Contrary to a popular misconception, the area did not become territory of the United Kingdom and the Netherlands retained sovereignty over it as the host country, similar to the status of diplomatic missions.

Land owned by a foreign country

One or more parcels/holdings of land in most countries is owned by other countries. Most instances are exempt from taxes. In the special case of embassies/consulates these enjoy special privileges driven by international consensus particularly the mutual wish to ensure free diplomatic missions, such as being exempt from major hindrances and host-country arrests in ordinary times on the premises. Most non-embassy lands in such ownership are also not enclaves as they fall legally short of extraterritoriality, they are subject to alike court jurisdiction as before their grant/sale in most matters. Nonetheless, for a person's offence against the property itself, equally valid jurisdiction in criminal matters is more likely than elsewhere, assuming the perpetrator is found in the prosecuting authority's homeland. Devoid of permanent residents, formally defined new sovereignty is not warranted or asserted in the examples below. Nonetheless, minor laws, especially on flag flying, are sometimes relaxed to accommodate the needs of the accommodated nation's monument.

Embassies enjoy many different legal statuses approaching quasi-sovereignty, depending on the agreements reached and in practice upheld from time-to-time by host nations. Subject to hosts adhering to basic due process of international law, including giving warnings, the enforced reduction of scope of a foreign embassy has always been a possibility, even to the point of expelling the foreign embassy entirely, usually on a breakdown of relations, in reaction to extreme actions such as espionage, or as another form of sanction. The same seems to be possible in profit-driven moving or drilling under any of the sites below, providing safeguards as the structure or a new replacement site. The same possible curtailments and alterations never apply to proper exclaves.

Examples of such land other than for diplomatic missions are:
 Napoleon's original grave in Longwood, Saint Helena, owned by France.
 Victor Hugo's house in Saint Peter Port (Saint-Pierre-Port), Guernsey, owned by the city of Paris.
 The Brest memorial in Brest, France, is owned by the U.S. It commemorates World War I.
 The Normandy American Cemetery and Memorial in Normandy, France, which contains the graves of 9,386 American military dead, most of whom died during the landings and ensuing operations of World War II, owned by the United States of America.
 Pointe du Hoc, the 13-hectare site of a memorial and museum dedicated to the World War II Normandy landing at Omaha Beach, France, transferred to the U.S. on 11 January 1979.
 The  to Russia's final Generalissimo Alexander Suvorov near Göschenen in central Switzerland, was erected 99 years after his death by the Russian Empire.
 The Vimy Memorial in France, which commemorates the Battle of Vimy Ridge.
 Two cemeteries on the Outer Banks of North Carolina, United States: one on Ocracoke Island and one on Hatteras Island in the town of Buxton, are owned by the United Kingdom hosting the British seamen washed ashore after World War II U-boat attacks of 10 April (one from the San Delfino) and 11 May 1942 (five from HMT Bedfordshire). Four graves are at Ocracoke and two at Buxton; three of the bodies were never identified; one of them could be that of a Canadian seaman. The plot of land at Ocracoke "has been forever ceded to England" and is maintained by the U.S. Coast Guard. The plot was leased to the Commonwealth War Graves Commission for as long as the land remained a cemetery. The graves on Hatteras Island are maintained by the U.S. National Park Service.
An historian on the occasion of the monument's 50th anniversary recorded in 1928 that the white stone "obelisk monument [was] erected to the memory of Captain Cook, about 1876, and on land deeded outright to the British Government by Princess Likelike, sister of King Kalakaua, about the same year, so that that square is absolute British Territory." Hawaii was a sovereign nation at the time. According to MacFarlane, "The land under the monument was deeded to the United Kingdom in 1877 and is considered as sovereign non-embassy land owned by the British Embassy in Washington DC. ... the Hawaiian State Parks agency maintained that as sovereign British territory it was the responsibility of the UK to maintain the site."
 Tiwinza in Peru: In the 1998 peace agreement following the 1995 Cenepa War, Peru ceded to Ecuador the property, but not the sovereignty, of one square kilometre within Tiwinza (where 14 Ecuadorian soldiers were buried). Ecuador had established a frontier military outpost in Tiwinza, an area that was specified in the agreement as belonging to Peru.

 The land under the John F. Kennedy memorial at Runnymede, United Kingdom was transferred from the Crown Estates to the United States of America by the John F. Kennedy Memorial Act 1964 (an Act of the U.K. Parliament); however, it is in the care of the U.K.-based Kennedy Memorial Trust.
 The Tomb of Suleyman Shah (of Suleyman Shah, the grandfather of Osman I, the founder of the Ottoman Empire) in Aleppo Governorate, Syria, is the property of Turkey. Article 9 of the Treaty of Ankara signed between France and Turkey in 1921, provides that the tomb "shall remain, with its appurtenances, the property of Turkey, who may appoint guardians for it and may hoist the Turkish flag there".
 Property and land owned by Sultan of Johor in Singapore, due to historical tie between the two. Notably the Temenggong Daeng Ibrahim Mosque in Singapore is administered by Majlis Agama Islam Johor instead of Islamic Religious Council of Singapore

Unusual cross-border transport channels

National railway passing through another state's territory
Changes in borders can make a railway that was previously located solely within a country traverse the new borders. Since diverting a railway is expensive, this arrangement may last a long time. This may mean that doors on passenger trains are locked and guarded to prevent illicit entry and exit while the train is temporarily in another country. Borders can also be in the "wrong" place, forcing railways into difficult terrain. In large parts of Europe, where the Schengen Area has eliminated border controls when travelling between its 27 member countries, this problem no longer exists, and railways can criss-cross borders with no need for border controls or locked trains.

Examples include:

Africa

 Due to inability to agree in 1963 on a shorter route through easy terrain, the iron ore railway in Mauritania originally had to use a longer route through a tunnel (built through 2 km of solid granite) near Choum to avoid the territory of Spanish Sahara. The tunnel is no longer in use and trains now use the shorter route through 5 km of Western Saharan territory controlled by the Polisario Front.
 In 2013, in Mozambique, the shortest railway route from coal mines at Tete to a port at Nacala passes through Malawi. A route through solely Mozambican territory is circuitous.
 In 1928, Congo (Belgium) and Angola (Portugal) exchanged some land to facilitate the new route of the railway to Congo-Kinshasa.

Americas
 Bolivia is landlocked and has no access to the sea, but a rail route runs through Chile from La Paz to the port of Arica on the Pacific Ocean. The rail route was built by Chile under the Treaty of Peace and Friendship of 1904 between Chile and Bolivia, with the Bolivian section transferred to Bolivia after 15 years. Bolivia enjoyed duty-free use of the railway and the ports connected.
 The Canadian National Railway’s Sprague Subdivision crosses the Canada-U.S. border twice along its length.  The subdivision is part of CN’s main line between Chicago and Western Canada, and sees significant rail traffic. Originating in Rainy River, Ontario, the line crosses the town’s namesake river and enters the U.S. at Baudette, Minnesota. It continues for 44 miles (70 km) through the State of Minnesota, before re-entering Canada and terminating 100 mi (160 km) further west in CN’s Symington Yard near Winnipeg, Manitoba. Signage and signalling adhere to Canadian Rail Operating Rules throughout the subdivision, including the U.S. section, eliminating the need for crew changes at the border crossings. Arrangements with Canadian and US border officials allow for ‘roll-through’ border clearances and inspections. 
 The Canadian Pacific Railway’s Newport Subdivision crosses the Canada-U.S. border three times along its length. Originating at Brookport, northwest of Cowansville, Quebec, it crosses the border 26 miles (42 km) to the southeast and passes through Richford, Vermont, re-entering Quebec 1.1 miles (1.8 km) later.  After a further 10.7 miles (17 km) east, it re-enters the U.S. before terminating in Newport, Vermont and connecting with the Washington County Railroad.
 The International Railway of Maine was a railroad constructed by the Canadian Pacific Railway (CPR) between Lac-Mégantic, Quebec, and Mattawamkeag, Maine, closing a key gap in the railway's transcontinental main line to the port of Saint John, New Brunswick. The railway was, however, at all times under American jurisdiction within the borders of the United States.
 The Woodland Rail Company owns an 11.8 mi (18.9 km) -long rail line that crosses the Canada-U.S. border twice along its length.  Originating at an interchange with the New Brunswick Southern Railway’s Milltown Spur in Calais, Maine, the line follows the former Maine Central Railroad’s Calais Branch and Woodland Spur.  From Saint Croix Junction, the line continues southwest, crossing the Saint Croix River at Baring, Maine, and entering Canada at Upper Mills, New Brunswick.  The line continues for 5 miles (8 km) through New Brunswick before re-entering the U.S. after crossing the Saint Croix River again at Sprague Falls.  The line terminates at the end of an industrial spur serving a pulp mill in Baileyville, Maine. 
 In order to avoid such a trans-border arrangement, the United States made the Gadsden Purchase of land from Mexico, on which it was planned to build a southern route for the transcontinental railroad. Owing to the topography of the area, acquisition of the land was the only feasible way to construct such a railroad through the southern New Mexico Territory.
 The former San Diego and Arizona Railway, completed in 1919, ran between the California cities of San Diego and El Centro with 71 km of track in Mexico between Tijuana and Tecate. The Mexican segment is now operated as the short line Baja California Railroad.

Europe

Current 
 Salzburg to Innsbruck (Austria) passes through Rosenheim, Germany. A railway line within Austria exists as well, but trains take about 1.5 hours longer than across German territory.
 Trains on the Birsig Valley Line from Basel to Rodersdorf, Switzerland, which passes through Leymen, France. It is operated by Baselland Transport and serviced by line no. 10, which continues into the Basel tram network.
 The Hochrheinbahn (High Rhine Railway) from Basel via Waldshut to Schaffhausen is part of the Deutsche Bahn network, and is mostly in Germany, but the two ends are in Switzerland and it is only connected with the rest of the German railway network via Switzerland. At both Basel and Schaffhausen the railway has extraterritorial status: one can travel by train to and from the rest of Germany without going through Swiss customs, despite travelling over territory of the Swiss Customs Area. See Basel Badischer Bahnhof.
 Trains from Neugersdorf, Saxony to Zittau pass Czech territory at Varnsdorf, while Czech trains from Varnsdorf to Chrastava pass through German territory at Zittau, and then a small part of Polish territory near the village of Porajów.
 Trains from Görlitz to Zittau, Germany, pass the border river Neisse several times (see Oder–Neisse line); the railway station for Ostritz, Germany, lies in Krzewina, Poland.
There is one station, Štrpci, but there are no border-crossing facilities, and trains do not call at the station.
 The Knin – Bihać railway between Croatia and Bosnia is split by the Croatian–Bosnian border several times. Similarly, the Savski Marof – Imeno railway was split by the Slovenian–Croatian border several times.
 Lučenec – Veľký Krtíš line in Slovakia passes through Hungary from Ipolytarnóc to Nógrádszakál.
 The local trains on the Burgenlandbahn in Austria cross the area of Hungary at Sopron. During the era of the Iron Curtain, the trains had their doors locked as they traversed Hungarian territory.
 The line from Ventimiglia to Limone Piemonte, Italy, via Breil-sur-Roya, France.
 The railway between France and Italy briefly leaves France to enter Monaco before entering France once more. The railway has a 5300-metre tunnel that goes through Monaco and further, and has an underground station in Monaco.
 For the Belgian Vennbahn (now a cycleway) narrow strips of Belgian territory were created running through Germany, creating five German exclaves.
 The former Soviet republics have numerous examples:
 Semikhody – Chernihiv-Ovruch railway of Ukraine passes through Belarus territory.
 Belarus/Lithuania: Adutiškis railway station straddles the Lithuania/Belarus border. Trains pass through Lithuanian territory while traveling to and from Belarus, and platforms are in both Belarus and Lithuania. The station is now mainly used for freight.
 Druzhba – Vorozhba line of Ukraine passes through Russian territory.
 In 2009, Russia and Kazakhstan agreed to transfer ownership of a cross-border section of line.
Trains running between Schaffhausen and Rafz pass through the German towns of Jestetten and Lottstetten.

Historical 
 During the Cold War, underground lines in West Berlin ran under parts of East Berlin. Ghost stations were stations on Berlin's U-Bahn and S-Bahn metro networks that were closed during this period of Berlin's division.
 In Finland, Porkkala was leased to the Soviet Union as a Soviet naval base between 1944 and 1956. Porkkala is located on the Rantarata, the main railway line between Helsinki and Turku. Initially, only Soviet traffic was permitted through, forcing Finnish State Railways to reroute the trains through a circuitous route via Toijala. However, in 1947, the Soviets agreed to let Finnish trains through. At the border, Finnish trains were shunted to a Soviet locomotive, windows were shuttered, guards were posted to the doors, and the Soviet locomotive would pull the train through the base area, to be shunted back to a Finnish locomotive at the opposite border.

Proposals 
 The shortest and straightest route for a proposed east–west high-speed railway in Austria through Linz, Salzburg and Innsbruck would pass under some mountains belonging to Germany.
 In 2012, a railway route was proposed from Angola proper to the enclave of Cabinda crossing not only the Congo River but also about 40 km of territory of the Democratic Republic of the Congo.

Highway of one state passing through another state's territory
This arrangement is less common as highways are more easily re-aligned. Some examples are:

Africa
 Congo Pedicle road: built to provide access for Zambia's Luapula Province to the Copperbelt through  of territory of the DR Congo, requiring a change from driving on the left to driving on the right.
 In Guinea, where 20 km long tunnel(s) through a hillspur at Naigaya (elevation ), Sicourou, Bokariadi and Feraya might be avoided by crossing the border into Sierra Leone at Yana (elevation ).
 Senegal is practically and inconveniently divided almost in two by the sovereign territory of The Gambia. Until the completion of the Senegambia bridge in 2019, the easiest way to travel from northern Senegal to the southern Casamance region was through Gambia via the Trans-Gambia Highway, with a connecting ferry being the only way to cross the Gambia River. The fare for the ferry crossing is a source of contention between the two countries.

Americas
 East Richford Slide Road in the U.S. state of Vermont crosses into the Canadian province of Québec for a distance of approximately 100 metres (300 feet) before returning to the United States. A cemetery lies directly on the border vista.

Asia
 The road from Dubai to the tourist spot of Hatta, an exclave of the emirate of Dubai, passes through a small stretch of Omani territory.
 The highway between Bishkek and Issyk Kul, both in Kyrgyzstan, skirts the border with Kazakhstan, with the highway and the border crossing each other for short distances at various points.

Europe
 Various roads cross the Republic of Ireland–United Kingdom border, back and forth between the Republic of Ireland and Northern Ireland. The N54 in County Monaghan (RoI) twice becomes the A3 in County Fermanagh (NI), before continuing as the N54. Similarly, the N53 in Monaghan passes through County Armagh (NI) as the A37, before resuming as the N53 at a point where County Armagh, County Monaghan and County Louth (RoI) all meet. , no national or border signs are present: the only indication is the change in margin markings and signs to indicate a change in speed limits between mph and km/h. It remains to be seen whether Brexit will change this friendly arrangement, which has persisted since the Good Friday Agreement of 1998.
 Between 1963 and 2002 the N274 road from Roermond to Heerlen, part of Dutch territory, passed through the German Selfkant, which had been annexed by the Netherlands after the Second World War but returned to Germany in 1963.
 Close to Narvik, a road from Norway twice enters and leaves Swedish territory, following the southern shore of the Kjårdavatnet lake. It does not connect with any other Swedish road in either location before it enters Norwegian land once more. It is private and built for hydropower plants but usable for public.
 Norwegian road 92 continues in Finland as road 92 before it continues as road 92 again in Norway. Norwegian road 7012 continues as road Z821 in Sweden before continuing as road 7012 in Norway again. Road Z821 (near Gäddede) had right-hand driving also before 1967 when the rest of Sweden had left-hand driving. These roads are mostly number construction and do not have special privileges.
 Road 402 between Podsabotin and Solkan in Slovenia, built when Slovenia was a state of Yugoslavia, passes through Italy for 1.5 kilometres. This section of the road does not intersect any other roads and is confined by high concrete walls topped by fences. As Slovenia and Italy are now both signatories to the Schengen Agreement, the barriers are little more than historical curiosities, although there is modern signage indicating that photography is forbidden along the Italian part of the road and that stopping is prohibited.
 The Saatse Boot Road in Estonia, between the villages of Lutepää and Sesniki, passes through Russian territory. The stretch of road passing through Russia is flanked by barbed wire fences and guard towers. Stopping and/or getting out of one's vehicle on the stretch of road is forbidden; the rule is enforced by Russian border guards.
 The D8 coastal highway of Croatia passes through a small section of Bosnia and Herzegovina territory, at the town of Neum, as it heads south from Split, Croatia to Dubrovnik.
Geneva Airport in Switzerland has a French Sector, which, while legally and geographically in Switzerland, is a de facto French domestic terminal used solely for flights to and from destinations in metropolitan France, and staffed by French officials. Thus, prior to Switzerland's accession to the Schengen Area (which entered into force for air travel in March 2009), the French Sector saved the need for border controls for flights between France and Geneva Airport. The French Sector is only accessible by a road connecting it directly to France, which passes through Swiss territory but has no junctions or other physical access to Switzerland. This road leads to a turn-off on the French side of the Ferney-Voltaire border crossing, thus bypassing Swiss passport controls when they were operational before 2009. While Switzerland's membership of the Schengen Area now renders the convenience of avoiding passport controls obsolete, there is still a small advantage gained in using the French Sector: Switzerland is not in the EU Customs Union, so customs (but not passport) checks are still carried out at Switzerland's border posts. The French Sector, with its road that leads directly to France without access to Switzerland, bypasses this requirement.
EuroAirport on French territory near Basel/Mulhouse is similar. It has a Swiss section with a customs-free road to Switzerland.
Basel (Badischer) and Geneva railway stations also have similar foreign areas.

Subnational highway passing through other internal territory

Americas 
 United States:
 Interstate 684, connecting various points in New York State, passes through Connecticut near Kensico Reservoir and Westchester County Airport but is maintained entirely by New York State. Motor vehicles cannot enter from nor exit to Connecticut roads, even though a portion of the highway is owned by Connecticut.
 A portion of New York State Route 17/Interstate 86 passes through South Waverly, Pennsylvania but is maintained entirely by New York State. This includes the roadway and traffic lights at the interchange with US Route 220 and a short portion of Pennsylvania Route 199. Nevertheless, Pennsylvania police enforce traffic laws on this short stretch, where there is one overpass built and owned by Pennsylvania.
 A  portion of New Hampshire Route 153 runs along the border with and briefly passes through Parsonsfield, Maine as it sweeps around the eastern shore of Province Lake.
Maintained by the Minnesota Department of Transportation, it intersects only a few dead-end local roads while in Wisconsin. No state line signs are present.
 Hopkins Road north of Newark, Delaware, briefly enters Pennsylvania where the Twelve-Mile Circle meets the Mason–Dixon Line. The road is maintained by Delaware, and it appears that at one time Arc Corner Road in Pennsylvania may have intersected here. Further east, Beaver Dam Road enters Chadds Ford Township, Pennsylvania at the intersection of Beaver Valley Road and re-enters Delaware about 0.5 miles later. It is unclear who is supposed to maintain the section in Pennsylvania.
The route through Colorado is maintained by the Wyoming Department of Transportation.
Use of the land for the freeway on Tribal land is under a lease agreement. The route is maintained by the Arizona Department of Transportation.

Asia 
 India
 The highway connecting Guwahati (capital of Assam state) to Silchar (a city in Barak valley of Assam) passes through Meghalaya state.
 One has to travel through part of West Bengal while travelling from Jamshedpur (Tatanagar), Jharkhand to a few other cities of Jharkhand like Ranchi or Dhanbad.
 Kota, a city in Rajasthan surrounded by territory of Madhya Pradesh, is connected to other parts of Rajasthan by roads passing through Madhya Pradesh.
 Gwalior (Madhya Pradesh) is connected to few other cities of Madhya Pradesh by highways passing through Uttar Pradesh, covering the city of Jhansi.
 Turkey:
 The main road for travel to Bartın via Zonguldak actually crosses Bartın first, traverses Zonguldak a short distance, then returns to Bartın.

Border transport infrastructure

Africa

 The Kazungula Bridge connects Zambia and Botswana in Southern Africa. The shared border between the two countries is approximately 150 m long, in the middle of the Zambezi River, and thus very nearly forms a quadripoint between Zambia, Botswana, Namibia, and Zimbabwe. Because the border between Zambia and Botswana is so short and because of the orientation of the river banks, the span of the bridge curves to avoid crossing the adjacent territory of Namibia or Zimbabwe.

Americas
 In 2009, the Canada Border Services Agency relocated its border inspection post from Cornwall Island, Ontario, a border region with the United States, to Cornwall, Ontario, across from the island and thus further inland, after protests erupted over the CBSA's firearm policy on Mohawk Nation’s sovereign land. To avoid severe penalty, people entering from the United States who are destined for the island are required to proceed across the island to report to the new CBSA post in Cornwall before making a U-turn to return to the island. Residents of the island visiting Cornwall or beyond must also report to the CBSA. Those returning to the island from Cornwall are the only group not required to go through any border inspection.

Asia
 The Hong Kong–Shenzhen Western Corridor on the Hong Kong–mainland China border: the immigration control points for Hong Kong (Shenzhen Bay Control Point) and mainland China (Shenzhen Bay Port) are co-located in the same building on the Shenzhen side of the bridge in an effective pene-exclave. The Hong Kong portion of the service building and the adjoining bridge are leased to Hong Kong, and are under Hong Kong's jurisdiction for an initial period until 30 June 2047.
 The Mainland Port Area in Kowloon High Speed Railway Station in downtown Hong Kong is under the jurisdiction of the Mainland Chinese authorities and courts. The 30 km long tunnel to the border is under Hong Kong jurisdiction, however, the train compartments of any train in operation (that is carrying passengers to or from the Mainland) are subject to Mainland Laws and jurisdiction. This arrangement was created to allow for immigration clearance to occur in Hong Kong for all trains travelling to and from the Mainland of China. This has stirred much controversy and multiple protests in Hong Kong.
 As a legacy of British Malaya, the Malaysian rail network had its southern terminus at Tanjong Pagar railway station in central Singapore. The land on which the station and the rail tracks stood was leased to Keretapi Tanah Melayu, the Malaysian state railway operator. Consequently, Malaysia had partial sovereignty over the railway land. Passengers had to clear Malaysian customs and immigration checks at Tanjong Pagar before boarding the train to Malaysia, even after Singapore shifted its border control facility to the actual border in 1998 and objected to the continued presence of Malaysian officials at the station. After a 20-year long dispute, the station was closed in 2011 and the railway land reverted to Singapore. A remnant of the rail corridor is still in use; KTM trains now terminate at Woodlands Train Checkpoint in northern Singapore near the border, which houses Malaysian and Singaporean border controls for rail passengers.

Europe
 Several bridges cross the rivers Oder and Neisse between Germany and Poland. To avoid needing to coordinate their efforts on a single bridge, the two riparian states assign each bridge to one or the other; thus Poland is responsible for all maintenance on some of the bridges, including the German side, and vice versa.
 The Hallein Salt Mine crosses from Austria into Germany. Under an 1829 treaty Austria can dig under the then-Kingdom of Bavaria. In return some salt has to be given to Bavaria, and up to 99 of its citizens can be hired to work in the Austrian mine.
 The twin town of TornioHaparanda or HaparandaTornio lies at the mouth of river Tornio, Tornio on the Finnish side and Haparanda on the Swedish side. The two towns have a common public transportation, as well as cultural services, fire brigade, sports facilities etc.
 The Basel Badischer Bahnhof is a railway station in the Swiss city of Basel. Although situated on Swiss soil, because of the 1852 treaty between the Swiss Confederation and the state of Baden (one of the predecessors of today's Germany), the largest part of the station (the platforms and the parts of the passenger tunnel that lead to the German/Swiss checkpoint) is treated administratively as an inner-German railway station operated by the Deutsche Bahn. The shops in the station hall, however, are Swiss, and the Swiss franc is used as the official currency there (although the euro is universally accepted). The Swiss post office, car rental office, restaurant and a cluster of shops are each separately located wholly within a surrounding station area that is administered by the German railway. The customs controls are located in a tunnel between the platforms and the station hall; international trains that continue to Basel SBB usually had on-board border controls, until they were abolished in 2008 when Switzerland joined the Schengen Area.
 The tram network in the French city of Strasbourg was extended into the neighbouring German city of Kehl in 2017.
 The railway stations of Audun-le-Tiche and Volmerange-les-Mines are both located in France but are owned, operated and maintained by the Luxembourg National Railway Company, as are the short stretches of railway between the stations and the Luxembourg border. Thus, holders of a Luxembourg railway pass can travel to these stations without requiring a French ticket. The stations are both end stations on different lines and are not physically connected to any French railway. There are no border issues, as both France and Luxembourg are in the Schengen Area. Likewise, a short stretch of narrow-gauge railway line connects Hendaye in south-western France to the rest of the San Sebastián Metro network over the border in Spain.
 The bus network of Bratislava, the capital of Slovakia, extends to the nearby Austrian village Wolfsthal where the train S7 (Schnellbahn) from Vienna has its terminal station. After the fall of the Iron Curtain, the abandoned rail road track from Wolfsthal to Bratislava could not be reinstalled because the land had been sold for housing projects.

See also
 Flagpole annexation
 Landlocked country
 Panhandle
 Inner suburb

Lists 
 List of countries that border only one other country
 List of enclaves and exclaves
 List of ethnic enclaves in North American cities
 List of former foreign enclaves in China

Citations

General and cited references

External links

 Rolf Palmberg's Enclaves of the world
 Jan S. Krogh's Geosite
 "Tangled Territories" 2005 review article on exclaves and enclaves in Europe published in Hidden Europe magazine
 Barry Smith's Baarle Site
 Evgeny Vinokurov's Theory of Enclaves - a comprehensive economic and political treatment of enclaves and exclaves

Enclaves and exclaves
Border-related lists
Political geography